is a Japanese footballer currently playing as a forward for Yokohama F. Marinos.

Career statistics

Club
.

Notes

References

External links

2001 births
Living people
Sportspeople from Fukuoka Prefecture
Association football people from Fukuoka Prefecture
Japanese footballers
Association football forwards

J1 League players
Yokohama F. Marinos players